Thomas Baker, an English landowner, was one of the leaders who initiated the Peasants' Revolt of 1381.

Thomas Baker's holding was "Pokattescroft alias Bakerescroft" in Fobbing. This holding still exists, although by the time of the 19th-century tithe map it had become known as Whitehall Six Acres

Role in the Revolt
The Peasants' Revolt was triggered by incidents in the Essex villages of Fobbing and Brentwood. On 30 May, John Brampton attempted to collect the poll tax from villagers at Fobbing. The villagers, led by Thomas Baker, a local landowner, told Brampton that they would give him nothing and he was forced to leave the village empty handed. Robert Belknap, Chief Justice of Common Pleas, was sent to investigate the incident and to punish the offenders. On 2 June, he was attacked at Brentwood. By this time the violent discontent had spread, and the counties of Essex and Kent were in full revolt. Soon people moved on London in an armed uprising.

Death
For his role in the uprising, Thomas Baker was hanged, drawn, and quartered on 4 July 1381 at Chelmsford.

References

English revolutionaries
Year of birth missing
1381 deaths
People from Fobbing
Peasants' Revolt
Executed people from Essex
14th-century English landowners
English rebels
People executed under the Plantagenets by hanging, drawing and quartering